Henrich Kováč (born 8 December 1994) is a Slovak football defender who currently plays for DOXXbet liga club FC Nitra.

Club career

FC Nitra
He started off his career at FC Nitra. Kováč was a captain of FC Nitra "juniori" ("B" team of FC Nitra) in the 2013/14 season. He made his professional debut for FC Nitra against ŠK Slovan Bratislava on 10 March 2014.

References

External links
FC Nitra profile 
Corgoň Liga profile

1994 births
Living people
Slovak footballers
Association football defenders
FC Nitra players
Slovak Super Liga players